Acetonedicarboxylic acid, 3-oxoglutaric acid or β-ketoglutaric acid is a simple dicarboxylic acid.

Preparation
Acetonedicarboxylic acid can also be prepared by decarboxylation of citric acid in fuming sulfuric acid:

Applications
Acetonedicarboxylic acid and its esters such as dimethylacetonedicarboxylate are primarily used as building blocks in the synthesis of heterocyclic rings and in the Weiss–Cook reaction.

Acetonedicarboxylic acid is well known to be used in the Robinson tropinone synthesis.

The presence of β-ketoglutaric acid in human urine is diagnostic for the harmful gut flora such as Candida albicans.

See also
 alpha-Ketoglutaric acid

References

Dicarboxylic acids
Beta-keto acids